Matarrese is a surname. Notable people with the surname include:

Antonio Matarrese (born 1940), Italian football manager
Giuseppe Matarrese (1934–2020), Italian Roman Catholic bishop
  (1937–2016), Italian entrepreneur

Italian-language surnames